Sugartooth is an alternative rock band that was formed in the early 1990s.

Timothy Michael Gruse (guitar), Josh Blum (bass), Dave Fortman (guitar) and Joey Castillo (drums) formed the group after meeting each other in the Southern California band circuit while playing in separate groups. After the departure of their original singer, Marc Hutner joined the band as the singer. But it wasn't until Dave Fortman left Sugartooth to join Ugly Kid Joe that Marc was able to play guitar in addition to singing. 

They immediately gained a lot of attention from label once their demo was sent around. After a huge bidding war, the band signed with Capitol Records. They then recorded the record at Pachyderm Studios Studio in Cannon Falls, Minnesota. Those recordings were soon scrapped and re-recorded in Los Angeles.

For some reason, Capitol didn't want to release the album, and dropped the band, but also gave them the full masters to shop for another record deal. Geffen Records signed the band with the album already done.  

Soon after, KNAC started to play Sold My Fortune a lot, and Geffen found themselves having to release the record earlier than planned because of the momentum KNAC was bringing to the table. The video appeared on an episode of Beavis and Butthead and the group regularly toured, playing with bands like Slayer, Supersuckers, Stone Temple Pilots, Soundgarden, and Ed Hall.

During one of their tours, Timothy Gruse departed the band and Dave Kushner was hired to finish out the tour. 

After the touring cycle for the first album ended and the band came home to work on the second album, Joey Castillo unexpectedly left the band to join Danzig.

Blum and Hutner were the only two remaining band members as they began to work on the second release, Sounds of Solid. Tommy Southard (from the band Godspeed) moved from NJ to So Cal to join the band during this time. Unfortunately financial struggles as well as musical and personality differences ended his time with Sugartooth. 

After months of writing and recording demos, Geffen felt they were ready to make their second record. Blum and Hutner were not interested in making a record that mirrored their last one, and relished the idea of exploring new sounds, techniques, and styles. It was because of this that they hired The Dust Brothers as producers. The Dust Brothers had never worked with a heavy rock band before, and everyone was excited about the experience of working together.  

album was soon sc  from They worked with two different drummers over time (Joey Castillo and Dusty Watson). The explosive success of alternative/grunge music and the growing appearance of bands like Candlebox prompted record companies to sign a large number of new bands as they came along; Sugartooth as a result quickly signed a contract with David Geffen, and the band's self-titled debut was released in 1994. The song "Sold My Fortune" became a modest hit after appearing on an episode of Beavis and Butthead and the group regularly opened shows for Slayer, Supersuckers, Stone Temple Pilots, and Soundgarden.

Castillo recorded drums for the band's follow up album before leaving to join Danzig.  During recording, Sugartooth contributed the music to a song called "Tortured Man" that the Dust Brothers were putting together for the soundtrack to the film Private Parts. This song would later feature vocals by Howard Stern (see Private Parts: The Album).

After the commercial failure of their 1996 album, the band split up.

In late 2021, official social media accounts were created for the band, where it was announced that original members Hutner, Blum, and Castillo were working on, and about to record, new music. In March 2022, the band confirmed that a new album was in the works, due out later in the year.

Discography

Albums
 Sugartooth (1994)
 The Sounds of Solid (1996)
 Volume 3 (2023)

References

Alternative rock groups from California
Musical groups established in 1990
Musical groups disestablished in 1997